Phả Lại is a ward of Chí Linh city in Hải Dương Province, Vietnam.

References

Communes of Hai Duong province
Populated places in Hải Dương province